Cofre de Perote, also known by its Nahuatl names Naupa-Tecutépetl (from Nāuhpa-Tēuctēpetl) and Nauhcampatépetl, both meaning something like "Place of Four Mountains" or "Mountain of the Lord of Four Places", is an inactive volcano located in the Mexican state of Veracruz, at the point where the Trans-Mexican Volcanic Belt, home to all of Mexico's highest peaks, joins the Sierra Madre Oriental.

A cofre is a coffer, and the name alludes to a volcanic outcropping on the shield which constitutes the peak of the mountain. To the north is the town of Perote, Veracruz, after which the mountain is named.

The area surrounding the volcano was protected by the Mexican government as a national park, known as Cofre de Perote National Park, in 1937.

Climate 

Cofre de Perote features a humid alpine climate (Köppen climate classification ET), without a dry season but having a rainier season in summer and autumn.

See also

List of mountain peaks of North America
List of mountain peaks of Mexico
List of volcanoes in Mexico

References

External links

Programa de manejo del Parque nacional Cofre de Perote, Universidad Veracruzana

Volcanoes of Veracruz
Mountains of Mexico
Landforms of Veracruz
Trans-Mexican Volcanic Belt
Sierra Madre Oriental
North American 4000 m summits
National parks of Mexico
Protected areas of Veracruz
Protected areas of the Trans-Mexican Volcanic Belt